Olinda Morais (born September 22, 1951), whose resistance name was By Mally, is a politician from East Timor. She is a member of the Democratic Party (Partido Democrático) (PD).

Morais was born in Loré, Lautém District, Portuguese Timor. She attended school only up to fourth grade. Despite this, she became a teacher. During the Indonesian occupation of East Timor, she fought against the invaders for fourteen years, until the end of 1991. Morais was married to Aluc Descart, a FALINTIL commander in the eastern region, with whom she had a son. Rather than have their 17-month-old son living in the forest with the guerillas, they sent him to be cared for by family in Lospalos; however, he was adopted by an Indonesian colonel and taken to Jakarta. Morais was not reunited with her son until 2003. 

Morais was elected to the National Parliament of East Timor on 7 July 2012, and remained a member of parliament until 2017. She served as a member of the Commission for Ethics (Commission G). In the 2017 elections, she was in position 33 on the ballot, and was not re-elected.

Awards 
In 2011, Morais, for her part in the resistance, received the Order of Guerillas, second degree, and the certificate of honor for demobilization.

References 

Living people
1951 births
East Timorese politicians
East Timorese women in politics
21st-century women politicians
Members of the National Parliament (East Timor)
Democratic Party (East Timor) politicians
East Timorese schoolteachers
People from Lautém District